Mario Alberto Molina Palma O.A.R. (born 13 October 1948) is archbishop of the Roman Catholic Archdiocese of Los Altos Quetzaltenango-Totonicapán since his appointment by Pope Benedict XVI on 14 July 2011. Molina Palma had previously served as bishop of Quiché in Guatemala. He was born in Panama City, ordained a priest in 1975, and appointed bishop of El Quiché in 2004. He was installed as Archbishop of Los Altos on 17 September 2011.

References 

1948 births
Living people
21st-century Roman Catholic archbishops in Panama
Augustinian Recollect bishops
Roman Catholic bishops of Quiché
Roman Catholic archbishops of Los Altos Quetzaltenango-Totonicapán
Panamanian Roman Catholic archbishops